The UFO Watchtower is an observation platform and campground north of Hooper, Colorado. The watchtower, which has a 360-degree view of the San Luis Valley, was created by Judy Messoline in May 2000 to capitalize on the existing use of the property by UFO observers.

There have been TV documentaries done on the UFO sightings in the area and several books have been written on the subject. Since its inception it has received widespread United States and international media coverage.

See also
Colorado Gators Reptile Park
List of UFO sightings

References

UFO culture in the United States
Buildings and structures in Alamosa County, Colorado
Tourist attractions in Alamosa County, Colorado
Roadside attractions in Colorado
2000 establishments in Colorado